Kana is a system of Japanese writing.

Kana may also refer to:

Media and technology
 Kana (publisher), a French publishing company
 Kana Software, a software company
 Kana TV, a private television station of Ethiopia
 KANA, a radio station of Montana, US

People
 Kana (given name), a Japanese given name (including a list of persons with the name)
 Kana (surname)
 Kana (rapper) (born 1977)
 Kana, Japanese musician and member of Chai
 Kana (wrestler), currently using the ring name "Asuka"

Places
 Kana (Lycaonia), ancient town now in Turkey
 Kana, Burkina Faso, a village in Balé Province 
 Kana Cone, a hill in British Columbia, Canada
 Kana (river), a river in Murmansk Oblast, Russia

Other uses
 A term used in Japanese poetry such as haiku
 Kana, a genus of leafhoppers
 An alternate name used for the Ogoni people of Nigeria
 Khana language, spoken by the Ogoni people of Nigeria
 Kana dialect, a variety of Cebuano, a language of the Philippines

See also
 
Qana, also transliterated Kana, a Lebanese village
Cana, a place in Galilee mentioned in the Bible
Cana (disambiguation)
Kanna (disambiguation)